General Crowell may refer to:

Benedict Crowell (1869–1952), U.S. Army Reserve brigadier general
Howard G. Crowell Jr. (born 1932), U.S. Army lieutenant general
John Crowell (Ohio politician) (1801–1883), Ohio State Militia major general